Spanish Brazilians are Brazilians of full or partial Spanish ancestry.

Spanish immigration was the third largest among immigrant groups in Brazil; about 750,000 immigrants entered Brazil from Spanish ports. How many Spaniards came to Brazil before independence are unknown. Brazilian censuses do not research "ethnic origins" or ancestry, which makes it very difficult to give accurate numbers of Brazilians of Spanish descent. Brazilians of Spanish descent can be estimated as being 1.5 million people in the 6 main metropolitan areas (around 5% of their total population in 1998)  or 10 and 15 million in the whole country, according to Brazilian media and the Spanish government respectively.

History

Colonial Brazil

More than half of modern Brazil's territory was attributed to Spain by the Treaty of Tordesillas. However, Spain was unable to settle that region.

During the dynastic union between Portugal and Spain (1580–1640), many Spaniards settled in Brazil, particularly in São Paulo. As a consequence, there are a large number of Brazilian descendants of these early settlers, especially since the early inhabitants of São Paulo explored and settled in other parts of Brazil. The descendants of Bartolomeu Bueno de Ribeira, born in Seville around 1555, who settled in São Paulo around 1583, marrying Maria Pires, are an example of this. Afonso Taunay, in his book dealing with early São Paulo, São Paulo in the XVI century, mentions also Baltazar de Godoy, Francisco de Saavedra, Jusepe de Camargo, Martin Fernandes Tenório de Aguilar, Bartolomeu de Quadros, among others. In his genealogical account of the settling of São Paulo, Pedro Taques de Almeida Paes Leme, also mentions the three Rendon brothers, Juan Matheus Rendon, Francisco Rendon de Quebedo and Pedro Matheus Rendon Cabeza de Vaca, as well as Diogo Lara, from Zamora. Spaniards from Galicia also settled in Brazil during that time, like Jorge de Barros, for example. The family names Bueno, Godoy, Lara, Saavedra, Camargo, etc., tracing back to these early settlers, are quite popular throughout Southeast Brazil, Southern Brazil and the Center-West. Silva Leme, in his work Genealogia Paulistana ("Paulistana Genealogy"), addresses several of these families.

The expansion of Portuguese-Brazilian settlements into Spanish-claimed territory was a long and gradual process, which took the form of Portuguese-Brazilian expeditions and settlements led by the Bandeirantes. Except for the Missions, no Spanish settlements actually existed in the territory of future Brazil by the middle of the 18th century, when most of it was under Portuguese control. This de facto control was legally recognized in 1750 when sovereignty over the vast area – including the Missions – was transferred from Spain to Portugal by the Treaty of Madrid.

While there is no historic evidence of Spanish settlements in the area that is now Rio Grande do Sul (other than São Gabriel, founded in 1800 and stormed by the Brazilian/Portuguese in 1801), some genetic research conducted on southern Brazilian gaúchos suggests that they may be mostly descended from mixed indigenous and Spanish ancestry rather than from Portuguese and indigenous ancestry. The study itself cautions that there may be difficulties with its identification of the respective Iberian (Portuguese and Spanish) contributions to the gaúcho population of southern Brazil (some caution is warranted because differentiation between Iberian Peninsula populations, as well as between them and their derived Latin American populations, at the Y-chromosome level, was not observed in other investigations).

Immigration

Spanish emigration peaked in the late 19th and early 20th centuries, and it was concentrated to Argentina and Cuba. Between 1882 and 1930, 3,297,312 Spaniards emigrated, of whom 1,594,622 went to Argentina and 1,118,960 went to Cuba. Brazil only started to be an important destination for immigrants from Spain in the 1880s, and the country received the third largest number of immigrants from that country, after Argentina and Cuba.

It is estimated that since Brazil's independence (1822) some 750,000 Spaniards have entered Brazil. This figure represents between 12.5% and 14% of all foreigners entering Brazil since its independence and puts the Spaniards in the third place among immigrant nationalities in Brazil, but it possibly includes Portuguese emigrating on false Spanish passports, or Galicians who, while Spanish citizens, spoke a language similar to Portuguese; in fact, Portuguese immigrants in Rio de Janeiro are popularly known as "galegos" (Galicians). Spanish immigrants were among those who had a higher rate of permanent residence in Brazil, overtaken by the Japanese but above nationalities such as Portuguese, Italian or German. This may be due to the large number of families traveling with passage paid by the Brazilian government that left their native Spain to work on coffee plantations of the state of São Paulo. Most Spanish immigrants entered Brazil between 1880 and 1930, with the peak period between 1905 and 1919, when their annual entrances overcame those of Italians.

Origins and destinations
In the state of São Paulo, destination of the majority of Spanish immigrants (about 75% of the total), 60% were from Andalusia, had their travel by ship paid by the Brazilian government, emigrated in families and were taken to the coffee farms to replace African slave manpower.

After São Paulo, the second largest contingent came to Rio de Janeiro, while other states such as Minas Gerais, Rio Grande do Sul, Paraná, Mato Grosso, Pará and Bahia received smaller groups. In all those states, immigrants from Galicia were the vast majority, at about 80%, and those were predominantly males who emigrated alone, settled in urban centers and paid for their travel by ship. Galician smallholders settled mainly in urban areas of Brazil. Starting in the early 20th century, most Spanish immigrants were Andalusian peasants who worked in the coffee plantations, mainly in rural areas of São Paulo State.

The profile of the Spanish immigrants during the period 1908–26 shows that 82.7% immigrated in families, 81.4% were farmers, only 2.2% were artisans or skilled workers and 16.3% were in category of "others". These data reflect that Spanish immigration was not very diversified and qualified and had a low mobility since it was subsidized by the Brazilian Government, so immigrants were not free to decide where to work. In this way, the vast majority of those who came to São Paulo were directly taken to the coffee farms without having the opportunity to settle rural communities as land owners, or work in urban jobs.

The Galegos

In Northeastern Brazil, people with light or blue eyes or light colored hair are often called galegos (Galicians), even if not of Galician descent, probably explained due to the fact Galicians came to Brazil among Portuguese colonizers. In Rio de Janeiro, the Galician immigrants were so present that Iberian and Portuguese immigrants were referred to as galegos.

Numbers of immigrants

 Clóvis Bornay
 Amador Bueno

 Pedro Casaldáliga (Catalan born)
 Raul Cortez
 Mário Covas
 Millôr Fernandes
 Daniel Filho
 Raul Gil
 Domingo García y Vásquez
 José Mojica Marins
 Gal Costa
 André Franco Montoro
 Jaime Oncins
 Oscarito
 Nélida Piñon (of Galician descent)
 Roberto Salmeron
 Ivete Sangalo
 Tonico & Tinoco
 Drauzio Varella
 Heitor Villa-Lobos
 Marco Luque

Education

There is one Spanish international school in Brazil, Colégio Miguel de Cervantes in São Paulo.

Notable People
Boison Wynney

See also

 Brazil–Spain relations
 Immigration to Brazil
 White Brazilian
 White Latin American

References

Further reading

Sanchez Albornoz, N. La Población de América Latina. Ed. Alianza América.
Diegues Junior, M. Regioes culturais do Brasil. Centro de pesquisas educacionais. INEP-MEC.1960.
Meijide Pardo, A. Brasil, la gran potencia del siglo XXI.
De Souza Martins, J. La inmigración española en Brasil. Dentro de Españoles hacia América. La emigración en masa, 1880–1930. De Sanchez Albornoz.
Pinto Do Carmo. Algunas figuras españolas en la prosa brasileña de ficción. Revista de Cultura Brasileña. nº35. 1973.

 
 
Spanish diaspora by country